Kabeli B1 Hydropower Station (Nepali: काबेली B-१ जलविद्युत आयोजना) is a 25 MW run-of-river hydro-electric plant located in   Panchthar District of Nepal. The promoter and operator, with a 20% share, is Arun Kabeli Power Limited (AKPL), a subsidiary of Arun Valley Group.

Location and water supply

Kabeli B1 Hydropower Station is a run-of-the-river hydroelectricity station located in the Panchthar and Taplejung districts of Mechi Zone in the Eastern Development Region of Nepal.
It is along the Kabeli River near where it is joined by the Iwa River.
The flow is used to generate 25 MW electricity.

Construction

The Kabeli B-1 project was launched in December 2010.
Palanchowk Construction Company undertook civil works and Api Hydromechanical Company undertook hydro-mechanical work.
Palanchowk and Api are both affiliated with the Arun Valley Group, the project promoter.
Andritz Hydro Pvt of India and the associated Neon Energy Pvt of India won the electromechanical contract.
The Ministry of Energy approved an initial environmental examination report on 27 August 2012 and granted a power generation license on 12 July 2013.
As of mid-March 2016 construction was 25% complete.

As of 2017 the project was one of 37 being built in the Eastern Region of Nepal.
In November 2017 Arun Kabeli Power Limited reported that 95% of construction was completed, and test production could begin in mid-February 2018.
The civil works, hydro mechanical works and electromechanical works were mostly completed, including the dam, sedimentation reservoir, penstock pipeline, surge tank and powerhouse.
Six of the sixteen transmission line towers had been installed.
Structures still under construction included intake and tailrace gates and several intermediate gates, as well as installation of two turbines, governors, generators and transformers.

Test electricity generation began in September 2019, with plans to start normal power production within a month if the Nepal Electricity Authority gave permission to connect to the central transmission line.
The plant started delivering electricity from 23 Ashwin 2076 BS, or 10 October 2019 CE.
According to the Arun Kabeli Power Company, power delivery had been delayed by one year due to delays in completion of the third section of the transmission line.

Technical description

The intake is in the Tharpu and Thumbedin VDCs.

From the de-sanding basin a  headrace pipe with diameter  carries the water to the power station.
At its lower end the conduit feeds into a vertical cylindrical concrete surge tank.

Power is generated by two horizontal 12.5 MW Francis turbines.
These feed two generators with rated voltage of 6.3 kV.
The energy is carried to the national grid by the Mechi Corridor 132 kV transmission line from Damak to Amarpur in Panchthar district.
The transmission line has 16 towers.
Planned annual power production was about 151.65 GWh.

Ownership and finance

The estimated cost as of November 2017 was Rs4.3 billion.
As of November 2017 70% of the project was owned by the state-owned Hydroelectricity Investment and Development Company with a consortium of banks including Nepal Investment Bank, Nabil Bank, Machhapuchchhre Bank, Prabhu Bank, Laxmi Bank and Global IME Bank.
20% was owned by the promoter Arun Kabeli Power Limited (AKPL), an Independent Power Producer. 
The remaining 10% was reserved for the people of Panchthar and Taplejung.
Arun Kabeli Power Limited (AKPL) was incorporated on 17 January 2011 and is part of Arun Valley Hydropower Group.

AKPL signed agreements with the Nepal Electricity Authority to connect the station to the grid and to purchase the power in 2012.
The power purchase rate is Rs.4.80 per kW in the wet months (May to December) and Rs.8.40 per kW in the dry months (January to April).
The generation licence will expire after 30 years in 27 Jesṭha 2105 BS, after which the plant will be handed over to the government.

See also

List of power stations in Nepal

References

Sources

 

Hydroelectric power stations in Nepal
Gravity dams
Run-of-the-river power stations
Dams in Nepal
Irrigation in Nepal
2019 establishments in Nepal
Buildings and structures in Panchthar District